Flesh Fly is a popular fly pattern used by rainbow trout anglers in Western Alaska. This particular fly fishing pattern is designed to mimic a chunk of rotten salmon flesh washing down stream. The pattern is usually tied using white or off white rabbit hair.

References

Artificial flies